Operation Deliberate Force was a sustained air campaign conducted by the North Atlantic Treaty Organization (NATO), in concert with the United Nations Protection Force (UNPROFOR) ground operations, to undermine the military capability of the Army of Republika Srpska (VRS), which had "threatened and attacked" UN-designated "safe areas" in Bosnia and Herzegovina during the Bosnian War with the Srebrenica genocide and Markale massacres, precipitating the intervention. The shelling of the Sarajevo marketplace on 28 August 1995 by the VRS is considered to be the immediate instigating factor behind NATO's decision to launch the operation.

The operation was carried out between 30 August and 20 September 1995, involving 400 aircraft and 5,000 personnel from 15 nations. Commanded by Admiral Leighton W. Smith Jr., the campaign struck 338 Bosnian Serb targets, many of which were destroyed. Overall, 1,026 bombs were dropped during the operation, 708 of which were precision-guided. On 19 occasions, depleted uranium munitions were used against targets around Sarajevo and Han Pijesak.

The bombing campaign was also roughly conterminous in time with Operation Mistral 2, two linked military offensives of the Croatian Army (HV), the Army of the Republic of Bosnia and Herzegovina (ARBiH), and the Croatian Defence Council (HVO) launched in western Bosnia.

The campaign also lifted the siege of Sarajevo which led to the way for a negotiated settlement.

Background
The Bosnian War was an international armed conflict that took place in Bosnia and Herzegovina between 1 April 1992 and 14 December 1995. After popular pressure, the North Atlantic Treaty Organization (NATO) was asked by the United Nations to intervene in the Bosnian War after allegations of war crimes against civilians were made. In response to the refugee and humanitarian crisis in Bosnia, the United Nations Security Council passed Resolution 743 on 21 February 1992, creating the United Nations Protection Force (UNPROFOR). The UNPROFOR mandate was to keep the population alive and deliver humanitarian aid to refugees in Bosnia until the war ended.

On 9 October 1992, the United Nations Security Council passed Resolution 781, prohibiting unauthorized military flights in Bosnian airspace. This resolution led to Operation Sky Monitor, where NATO monitored violations of the no-fly zone, but it did not take action against violators of the resolution. On 31 March 1993, in response to 500 documented violations, the United Nations Security Council passed Resolution 816, which authorized states to use measures "to ensure compliance" with the no-fly zone over Bosnia. In response, on 12 April, NATO initiated Operation Deny Flight, which was tasked with enforcing the no-fly zone and allowed to engage the violators of the no-fly zone. However, Serb forces on the ground continued to attack UN "safe areas" in Bosnia, and the UN peacekeepers were unable to fight back as the mandate did not give them authority to do so. On 4 June, the United Nations Security Council passed Resolution 836 authorizing the use of force by UNPROFOR in the protection of specially designated safe zones. Operation Sharp Guard, a naval blockade in the Adriatic Sea by NATO and the Western European Union, was approved at a joint session of NATO and the WEU on 8 June and began on 15 June.

On 6 February 1994, a day after the first Markale marketplace massacre, UN Secretary-General Boutros Boutros-Ghali formally requested NATO to confirm that air strikes would be carried out immediately. On 9 February, agreeing to the request of the UN, NATO authorized the Commander of Allied Forces Southern Europe (CINCSOUTH), US Admiral Jeremy Boorda, to launch air strikes against artillery and mortar positions in and around Sarajevo that were determined by UNPROFOR to be responsible for attacks against civilian targets. Only Greece did not support the use of air strikes, but it did not veto the proposal. The council also issued an ultimatum at the 9 February meeting to the Bosnian Serbs, in which they demanded that the Serbs remove their heavy weapons around Sarajevo by midnight of 20–21 February or face air strikes. There was some confusion surrounding compliance with the ultimatum, and Hungarian Prime Minister Péter Boross announced that Hungary's air space would be closed to NATO aircraft in the event of air strikes. On 12 February 1994, Sarajevo enjoyed its first casualty-free day in 22 months (since April 1992).

On 28 February, NATO fighters operating under Deny Flight shot down four Bosnian Serb fighters for violating a no-fly zone in what would become known as the Banja Luka incident. This was the first combat operation in the history of NATO.

On 12 March, the United Nations Protection Force (UNPROFOR) made its first request for NATO air support, but close air support was not deployed, owing to a number of delays associated with the approval process. On 10 and 11 April 1994, UNPROFOR called in air strikes to protect the Goražde safe area, resulting in the bombing of a Bosnian Serb military command outpost near Goražde by two US F-16 jets. This was the first time in NATO's history it had ever attacked ground targets with aircraft. Subsequently, the Bosnian Serbs took 150 UN personnel hostage on 14 April. On 16 April, a British Sea Harrier was shot down over Goražde by Bosnian Serb forces. Around 29 April, a Danish contingent (Nordbat 2) on peacekeeping duty in Bosnia, as part of UNPROFOR's Nordic battalion located in Tuzla, was ambushed when trying to relieve a Swedish observation post (Tango 2) that was under heavy artillery fire by the Bosnian Serb Šekovići brigade at the village of Kalesija, but the ambush was dispersed when the UN forces retaliated with heavy fire in what would be known as Operation Bøllebank.

On 5 August, at the request of the UNPROFOR, two US A-10 Thunderbolts located and strafed a Bosnian Serb anti-tank vehicle near Sarajevo after the Serbs seized weapons that had been impounded by UN troops and attacking a UN helicopter. Afterwards, the Serbs agreed to return the remaining heavy weapons. On 22 September 1994, NATO aircraft carried out an air strike against a Bosnian Serb tank at the request of UNPROFOR.

On 25–26 May 1995, after violations of the exclusion zones and the shelling of safe areas, NATO aircraft carried out air strikes against Bosnian Serb ammunition depots in Pale. In retaliation, the Bosnian Serbs took 370 UN peacekeepers in Bosnia hostage and subsequently used them as human shields at potential targets in a successful bid to prevent further air strikes. On 2 June, two US Air Force F-16 jets were sent on patrol over Bosnia in support of Operation Deny Flight. While on patrol, an F-16 piloted by Captain Scott O'Grady was shot down by a Bosnian Serb 2K12 Kub surface-to-air missile. O'Grady was forced to eject from the aircraft. The event would come to be known as the Mrkonjić Grad incident.

On 11 July, NATO aircraft attacked targets in the Srebrenica area of Bosnia and Herzegovina as identified by and under the control of the United Nations. This was in response to Bosnian Serb forces advancing on the UN-declared Safe Area of Srebrenica. Bosnian Serb warlord Ratko Mladić threatened to kill 50 UN peacekeepers who were seized as hostages and also threatened to shell the Muslim population in Srebrenica if NATO air strikes continued. The UN peacekeepers called off the air strikes and agreed to withdraw from Srebrenica as the Bosnian Serbs promised they would take care of the Muslim population for the peacekeepers to spare their own lives. For two weeks, VRS forces under Mladić killed over 8,000 Bosniaks, mainly men and boys, in the Srebrenica massacre, which remains the worst act of genocide in Europe since World War II.

On 25 July, the North Atlantic Council authorized military planning aimed at deterring an attack on the safe area of Goražde, and threatened the use of NATO air power if this safe area was threatened or attacked. On 1 August, the Council took similar decisions aimed at deterring attacks on the safe areas of Sarajevo, Bihać, and Tuzla. On 4 August, NATO aircraft conducted air strikes against Croat Serb air defense radars near Udbina airfield and Knin in Croatia. On 10 August, the Commanders of Allied Forces Southern Europe (CINCSOUTH) and UNPROFOR concluded a memorandum of understanding on the execution of air strikes.

Campaign
On 30 August, the Secretary General of NATO announced the start of air strikes, supported by UNPROFOR rapid reaction force artillery attacks. Although planned and approved by the North Atlantic Council in July 1995, the operation was triggered in direct response to the second Markale massacre on 28 August 1995.

As many as 400 NATO aircraft participated in the air campaign. Overall, 3,515 sorties were flown and a total of 1,026 bombs were dropped on 338 Bosnian Serb targets located within 48 complexes. NATO aircraft struck 97% of their targets, and seriously damaged more than 80% of them. 708 of the bombs dropped were precision-guided munitions. The VRS integrated air defence network, comprising aircraft and surface-to-air missiles (SAMs), presented a high-threat environment to NATO air operations.

The German Luftwaffe saw action for the first time since 1945 during Operation Deliberate Force. Six interdictor-strike (IDS) version Tornados, escorted by eight ECR Tornados, pinpointed Serb targets around Sarajevo for the Rapid Reaction Force artillery to attack.

Rapid Reaction Force
Frustrated by the previous absence of results and the resistance of the Serbian parties to any peace progress, the Western powers, led by French President Jacques Chirac, decided to put a deterrent force in-country to support western diplomatic efforts. France, the UK and the US decided to send a multinational (MN) brigade to the Sarajevo area (Mount Igman), supported by an airmobile brigade and an armored battalion in reserve. The MN Brigade consisted of 4000 military (2000 French, 1500 British, 500 Dutch).

The creation of the force was authorized by UN Resolution 998 on 16 June 1995.

Commanded by French General Andre Soubirou, the MN brigade was operational in August 1995 on Mount Igman. The main force consisted of a mixed artillery regiment (French artillery group with eight 155 mm AUF1 howitzers, British artillery group with twelve 105 mm light guns, French and Dutch 120 mm Heavy Mortar company). Although the artillery fired before and after the Markale Market Massacre, the main action was on 28 and 29 August 1995, firing 1070 shells on Serbian positions (305 155mm shell, 408 120mm shell, 357 105 mm shells). This artillery group was part of the UNPROFOR deployed on Mount Igman to support the task of NATOs aircraft by pounding Serb artillery positions.

On 30 August, a French Mirage 2000N was shot down by a Bosnian Serb shoulder-fired SAM near Pale. On 1 September, NATO and UN demanded the lifting of the Serb's Siege of Sarajevo, removal of heavy weapons from the heavy weapons exclusion zone around Sarajevo, and complete security of other UN safe areas. NATO stopped the air raids and gave an ultimatum to Bosnian Serb leaders. The deadline was set as 4 September. On 5 September 1995, NATO resumed air attacks on Bosnian Serb positions around Sarajevo and near the Bosnian Serb headquarters at Pale after the Bosnian Serbs failed to comply with the ultimatum. On the night of 10 September, the   launched a Tomahawk missile strike from the central Adriatic Sea against a key air defense radio relay tower at Lisina, near Banja Luka, while US Air Force F-15E and US Navy F/A-18 fighter-bombers hit the same targets with about a dozen precision-guided bombs, and F-16 jets attacked with Maverick missiles.

On 14 September, NATO air strikes were suspended to allow the implementation of an agreement with Bosnian Serbs to include the withdrawal of heavy weapons from the Sarajevo exclusion zone. The initial 72-hour suspension was eventually extended to 114 hours. Finally on 20 September, General Bernard Janvier (Commander, UNPF) and Admiral Leighton W. Smith, Jr. (CINCSOUTH) agreed that the resumption of air strikes was not necessary, as Bosnian Serbs had complied with the conditions set out by the UN, and so the operation was terminated.

Aftermath
The two French airmen who were captured after their Mirage 2000N was downed by Bosnian Serb forces on 30 August 1995, Lt. Jose Souvignet and Capt. Frederic Chiffot, were released only upon the end of the Bosnian War, on 12 December 1995. Upon being released, they told reporters that they had been treated well while in captivity.

In December 1995, NATO dispatched a 60,000-strong peacekeeping force into Bosnia as part of the IFOR to enforce the Dayton Peace Agreement to secure peace and prevent renewed hostilities between three warring factions. In December 1996, the NATO-led SFOR was established to replace the IFOR to enforce the Dayton Peace Agreement. This lasted up until December 2004, when the EUFOR Althea replaced the NATO-led SFOR.

See also

NATO bombing of Yugoslavia

References

External links

Operation Deliberate Force fact sheet, NATO website, updated 16 December 2002.
"Operation Deliberate Force," Globalsecurity.org.
"Aircraft Carrier USS America Replaces USS Roosevelt in Adriatic," 12 September 1995, CNN.
"Louder Than Words," TIME magazine, September 11, 1995.
"If U.S. Force Is Needed In Bosnia," by Michael Johns, The Christian Science Monitor, 25 February 1994.

Conflicts in 1995
1995 in Bosnia and Herzegovina
Bosnian War
Bosnian War
Aerial bombing operations and battles
Military operations of the Bosnian War
Military operations of the Yugoslav Wars involving Germany
Aerial operations and battles involving Germany
20th-century Royal Air Force deployments
Strategic bombing operations and battles
Military campaigns involving Germany
August 1995 events in Europe
September 1995 events in Europe
Aerial operations and battles involving Italy
Aerial operations and battles involving the United States
Aerial operations and battles involving the United Kingdom